Chelsea Anne Cardona (née Green); (born April 4, 1991) is a Canadian professional wrestler, stuntwoman and model. She is currently signed to WWE, where she performs on the Raw brand under the ring name Chelsea Green. She is also known for her time in Impact Wrestling where she is a former Impact Knockouts Champion and Impact Knockouts World Tag Team Champion. 

Green has appeared extensively on the independent wrestling circuit in North America and Asia. In addition, Green has appeared for the NWA, Ring of Honor, World Wonder Ring Stardom, and her first appearance in Impact Wrestling, where she performed under the ring name Laurel Van Ness and held the Impact Knockouts Championship; she also played Reklusa on the Lucha Underground TV series.

Professional wrestling career

Independent circuit (2014–2018) 
Under the ring name Jaida, she wrestled on for Elite Canadian Championship Wrestling (ECCW). Her first match on May 31, 2014, at ECCW Better Than You. She teamed with Brady Malibu and MR2 in a losing six-man tag match against Billy Suede, Kenny Lush & Nicole Matthews. She next joined a Women's title tournament, winning the first round against Kaitlin Diamond. On December 8, 2014, at the conclusion of the Women's title tournament held at ECCW Payoff, she defeated Kate Carney in the semi-finals.

In 2016, Green toured Japan twice for World Wonder Ring Stardom (WWRS). Her first tour was three months long, but was cut short by a broken collarbone while wrestling in India. Green's second tour of Japan was in late 2016, where she teamed with Santana Garrett for the 2016 Goddesses of Stardom Tag League. During this tour, Green also challenged Wonder of Stardom Champion Kairi Hojo to a match but lost. Green was undefeated in singles bouts in Japan, prior to her loss to Hojo.

Queens of Combat 17 on February 18, 2017 saw the start of the QOC Tag Team Championship tournament to crown the first QOC Tag Team Champions. Van Ness teamed with Taeler Hendrix and defeated Aja Perera and Kiera Hogan in the first round. At Queens of Combat 18, also on February 18, they defeated Nevaeh and Rachael Ellering in the semi-finals. Hendrix and Van Ness defeated The Lucha Sisters (Leva Bates and Mia Yim) to become the first QOC Tag Team Champions.

In September 2018, Green performed on the All In pay-per-view show, the first independent wrestling event in the U.S. to draw a live attendance of at least 10,000 fans. Green wrestled Britt Baker, Madison Rayne, and Tessa Blanchard in a Four corner survival match.

In 2021, Green announced she would be starting her own podcast with the first episode airing April 26, 2021.

Total Nonstop Action Wrestling (TNA) / Impact Wrestling (2016–2018) 
On January 7, 2016, Green made her TNA debut under the ring name "Chelsea," losing to Jade. The following night on January 8 at TNA One Night Only: Live!, she wrestled in a number one contenders gauntlet battle royal match for the TNA Knockouts Championship, entering the ongoing match at number four before being eliminated by Awesome Kong.

In June 2016, Green officially signed with Impact. She made her televised debut as a heel on the September 29 episode of Impact Wrestling under the new ring name Laurel Van Ness, defeating Madison Rayne. On the October 20 episode of Impact Wrestling, Van Ness attacked Allie which led to a match between the two where Van Ness was victorious. She attacked Allie again the following week, which led to another match between the two on the December 8 episode of Impact Wrestling, Van Ness was defeated.

In late 2016, Van Ness formed an on-screen relationship with Braxton Sutter. On February 23, 2017, the two were set to marry until Van Ness got rejected by Sutter during their wedding when he professed that he was in love with Allie (who is Sutter's legitimate wife). The following week of Impact Wrestling, the Lady Squad quietly disbanded when former leader Maria's contract expired.

In March, Van Ness started a maniacal gimmick, wrestling with a severely disheveled appearance (including a messy, damaged wedding dress and chaotic-looking make-up), barefoot, and carrying a wine bottle to the ring. Grado tried to propose to her on July 27, however he was interrupted by Kongo Kong.

On the August 24 episode of Impact, Van Ness came out, all cleaned-up, during Grado's deportation farewell address. She took out a wedding ring, asked Grado if he wanted to marry her and he said yes, establishing herself as a babyface for the first time in Impact. However, after Grado found out that Van Ness was Canadian, not American, he called off the wedding on the September 7 episode of Impact. Van Ness began turning heel when she reverted to her emotionally chaotic gimmick, which later included going out in the crowd and campaigning for a husband. On November 5, at Bound for Glory, Van Ness attacked Grado during his Monster's Ball match against Abyss, completing her heel turn, only to be on the receiving end of Rosemary's mist.

On November 8, which aired on a tape delay on December 14, Van Ness defeated Rosemary in a tournament final for the vacant Impact Knockouts Championship. During that time she also returned to her 'normal' ring gear instead of the ruined wedding dress, but retaining her chaotic/'drama' gimmick. Behind the scenes, Green planned to leave Impact Wrestling upon her contract's expiration, believing WWE would then immediately hire her, but Impact's producers cast her as champion before Green notified them she intended to leave. So, Green asked for her contractual release from the company while one of its onscreen titleholders; management, predictably, refused to release her while she was still champion in its storylines. On January 15, 2018, Impact officially released Green after she had completed her matches in the television tapings (where she ensured a smooth storyline continuity by losing the Knockouts Title to Allie).

Lucha Underground (2018) 
Green debuted during the season four tapings of Lucha Underground on February 25, 2018, under the stage name "Reklusa." Green wrestled a fatal four-Way with Jeremiah Crane, XO Lishus, and Marty "The Moth" Martinez. On October 10, Reklusa lost to Pentagón Dark in the main event.

WWE (2018–2021) 
During the feud between Brie Bella and Stephanie McMahon, Green appeared on the August 11, 2014 episode of Raw, portraying Daniel Bryan's physical therapist "Megan Miller," confessing that the two had been having an affair before an infuriated Bella stormed the ring and slapped her. In 2015, Green reappeared under her real name, as a contestant on the sixth season of the re-launched Tough Enough finishing in fourth place for the females.

Chelsea took part in WWE tryouts and was signed on August 3, 2018. Chelsea started at the WWE Performance Center on October 8, 2018 and made her NXT in-ring debut at a live event on October 26, 2018, competing under her familiar "psychotic" gimmick. However, she suffered a broken wrist during her first TV match on the March 13, 2019 NXT TV tapings and underwent surgery the following day on March 14. Green returned to the ring on June 29 at a NXT live event. Green appeared on the December 23, 2019 edition of Raw, competing in a losing effort against Charlotte Flair. On January 8, 2020 she was announced as the first member of professional wrestling manager Robert Stone's stable. On January 26, Green competed in the women's Royal Rumble match at the pay-per-view of the same name, which was eventually won by Flair.  On the March 4 episode of NXT, Green defeated Shotzi Blackheart to qualify for a Ladder match at Takeover: Tampa Bay to determine the #1 contender for the NXT Women's Championship. The ladder match was moved to the April 8 episode of NXT where the match was won by Io Shirai. On the May 27 episode of NXT, she fired Robert Stone. Following the wind-up of Green's partnership with Stone, WWE had planned to call her up to Raw, but after the show's executive director Paul Heyman left the position, the plan was scrapped. 

Green made her SmackDown debut on the November 13, 2020 edition of the show, where she participated in a fatal four-way qualifying match against Liv Morgan, Natalya, and Tamina to earn a spot at Survivor Series as part of the women's team, which Morgan won. Following the match, it was revealed that Green had broken her wrist again and that the planned finish which saw Green winning had to be changed to Morgan. After months of inactivity, on April 15, 2021, WWE released Green from her contract alongside other wrestlers.

Ring of Honor (2021) 
On July 11, 2021, Green made her surprise debut at Ring of Honor (ROH)'s Best in the World pay-per-view event, introduced by Maria Kanellis-Bennett (who was an onscreen personality and behind-the-scenes producer for ROH). Originally, Green was scheduled to wrestle in the ROH Women's World Championship tournament; however, Green suffered an arm/wrist fracture prior to the date of her first round match, and the Maryland Athletic Commission (every match except the final was taped for ROH's weekly TV show in Baltimore, Maryland) didn't medically clear her in time to participate. While recovering from injury, Green appeared as one of the onscreen commentators for the tournament's first round matches.

Return to Impact Wrestling

Championship pursuits (2021–2022) 
On July 17, 2021 at Slammiversary, Green returned to Impact Wrestling, but under her real name, wrestling in an intergender tag team match with real-life fiancé Matt Cardona, defeating Brian Myers and Tenille Dashwood. In October, Green entered the tournament to crown the first Impact Digital Media Champion: she defeated Madison Rayne in the first round, and lost to Jordynne Grace in the finals at the Bound for Glory pay-per-view show.

On January 8, 2022, at Hard to Kill, Green participated in the inaugural Knockouts Ultimate X match, which was won by Tasha Steelz. On the March 24, 2022 episode on Impact Wrestling, Green and Cardona attacked Mickie James after James was defeated by Steelz in a street fight match, turning heel in the process.

VXT (2022) 
On the July 21 episode of Impact!, Green alongside Deonna Purrazzo, now dubbed as "VXT", faced the Knockouts World Champion Jordynne Grace and Mia Yim, which they were victorious. On August 12, at the pre-show of Emergence, VXT defeated Rosemary and Taya Valkyrie to win the Impact Knockouts World Tag Team Championship. They lost the title on October 7 at Bound for Glory to The Death Dollz (Jessicka, Rosemary and Valkyrie), ending their reign at 56 days. Green had her last match with the company against Mickie James on the November 11 episode of Impact in a losing effort. After her loss to James, Green and Purazzo would have a backstage segment where Green would say she was "going home". It would then be reported that Green had left Impact officially.

Return to WWE (2023–present)
On January 28, 2023, Green made her surprise return to WWE at the 2023 Royal Rumble as a participant in the Women's Royal Rumble match. Entering the match at number 20, Green was quickly eliminated by Rhea Ripley in five seconds, a Women's Royal Rumble record. Upon her return, she became a member of the Raw brand and her character is portrayed as a Karen.

Personal life 
On April 4, 2019, her 28th birthday, Green announced her engagement to fellow professional wrestler, Matt Cardona. The two had been dating since January 2017. They were married on New Year’s Eve 2021 in Las Vegas.

Championships and accomplishments 

 All-Star Wrestling (British Columbia)
 ASW Women's Championship (1 time)
ASW Women’s Championship Tournament (2015)
 Impact Wrestling
 Impact Knockouts World Championship (1 time)
 Impact Knockouts World Tag Team Championship (1 time) – with Deonna Purrazzo
 National Wrestling Alliance
 NWA Women's Invitational Cup (2021)
 Pro Wrestling Illustrated
 Ranked No. 26 of the top 50 female singles wrestlers in the PWI Female 50 in 2017 and 2019
 Pro Wrestling 2.0
 PW2.0 Tag Team Championship (1 time) – with Santana Garrett
 Queens of Combat
 QOC Tag Team Championship (1 time) – with Taeler Hendrix
 QOC Tag Team Championship Tournament (2017) – with Taeler Hendrix

References

External links 

 
 
 
 

1991 births
Canadian female professional wrestlers
Living people
Professional wrestlers from British Columbia
Professional wrestling managers and valets
Sportspeople from Victoria, British Columbia
Tough Enough contestants
21st-century professional wrestlers
TNA/Impact Knockouts World Champions
TNA/Impact Knockouts World Tag Team Champions